Jay Batlle is an artist born in 1976, who received his Bachelor of Arts from UCLA in 1998. He went to the Ateliers in Amsterdam from 1998 to 2000. Batlle's "epicurean" paintings, drawings, and sculptures take the habits of the gourmet as a source of inspiration and social commentary. His oeuvre offers both a critique of comestible-related decadence and a celebration of the preparation and consumption of food across various cultures.

A skilled chef as well as an artist, Batlle's layered compositions often incorporate images and text from the food section of publications such as the New Yorker and the New York Times or stationery from restaurants around the world, as well as fragments of recipes, sketches, photographs, and other found objects. The resulting works are often finished off with coffee grounds, wine, and other food stains.

The artist's work examines "the good life"—success, fortune, and sensual pleasure—and the gulf that exists between this idealized life and reality. His work asks whether the point of art is to reach a top socioeconomic rank or simply to provide ones livelihood. As he explains: “Even if it’s idealistic, or romantic, my work needs a pathos … an urgency, a problem.” For Batlle, this source is humanity’s futile aspirations to a life that we ultimately cannot attain, which he expresses in his work through recurring imagery of women, glamorous parties, luxury brands and products, alcohol, food, and money.
 
Batlle’s work has been exhibited at galleries and museums including Metro Pictures, the Chelsea Museum, Exit Art, The Dorsky Gallery in New York City, the Ausstellungshalle Zeitgenössische Kunst in Münster, (Germany), the National Museum of Fine Arts, Santiago de Chile, and at the Museum of Liverpool, United Kingdom. He is represented by 1000eventi gallery in Milan, Italy and works with Nyehaus, in New York and Clages, in Cologne.

References

 https://web.archive.org/web/20110529161631/http://www.de-ateliers.nl/index.cfm?art_id=401&chapter_id=29
 http://www.dorsky.org/Previous%20Exhibits/previousexhibits.html
 http://nymag.com/daily/entertainment/2008/01/artist_jay_batlle_worlds_best.html
 http://www.artnet.com/artists/jay-batlle/
 http://www.interviewmagazine.com/blogs/art/2009-04-02/batlles-food-fight/
 http://www.huffingtonpost.com/david-coggins/jay-batlles-best-revenge_b_631136.html
 http://www.saatchi-gallery.co.uk/blogon/art_news/jay_batlle_in_conversation_with_ana_finel_honigman/4626
 http://1000eventigallery.it/index_eng.html
 http://www.nyehaus.com/
 https://web.archive.org/web/20110707141730/http://www.andrewroth.com/batlle.html
 http://www.saatchionline.com/jbatlle
 https://web.archive.org/web/20110710203119/http://www.essogallery.com/Jay%20Batlle/JB_Exhib.html
 https://web.archive.org/web/20120219015855/http://www.dibam.cl/bellas_artes/noticias.asp?sh=1&id=14564
 http://www.kunstaspekte.de/index.php?tid=71293&action=termin
 https://web.archive.org/web/20111021163830/http://www.artslant.com/global/artists/rackroom/9679-jay-batlle
 http://www.bbv-net.de/lokales/muenster/kultur/1560896_Mit_Spruechen_in_der_Schale.html
 http://www.theworldsbestever.com/2010/12/09/art-barter-new-york/

External links
 https://www.nytimes.com/2002/03/01/arts/art-in-review-now-is-the-time.html
 https://www.nytimes.com/2004/08/06/arts/art-in-review-relentless-proselytizers.html
 https://www.nytimes.com/2010/07/23/arts/design/23surfing.html
 http://www.artnet.com/artists/jay-batlle/
 http://www.nyehaus.com/
 http://1000eventigallery.it/
 https://web.archive.org/web/20110707141730/http://www.andrewroth.com/batlle.html
 https://web.archive.org/web/20110106155510/http://www.caseykaplangallery.com/exhibitions/2008/not_so_subtle_subtitle/04.html
 http://www.mariettaclages.de/
 https://web.archive.org/web/20111021163830/http://www.artslant.com/global/artists/rackroom/9679-jay-batlle
 http://www.abc.es/fotos-arte/20110527/everyday-just-same-black-1401469745428.html
 http://amylyne.com/#/photography/artists-and-creators/jonathan-gent-jay-batlle/JONI_JAY23

1976 births
Living people
20th-century American painters
American male painters
21st-century American painters
American draughtsmen
University of California, Los Angeles alumni
20th-century American sculptors
American male sculptors
20th-century American male artists